Pennsylvania State Senate District 28 includes part of York County. It is currently represented by Republican Kristin Phillips-Hill.

District profile
The district includes the following areas:

Senators

References

Pennsylvania Senate districts
Government of York County, Pennsylvania